Kamel Chaaouane (born 16 March 1984) is a French former footballer.

Career statistics

Club

Notes

References

1984 births
Living people
French footballers
French expatriate footballers
Association football forwards
Championnat National players
Singapore Premier League players
SC Toulon players
Hyères FC players
Expatriate footballers in Singapore
French expatriate sportspeople in Singapore
Étoile FC players
Sportspeople from Toulon
Footballers from Provence-Alpes-Côte d'Azur